Edward Kenneth Whiteside (born 11 December 1929) is an English former professional footballer who played as an inside forward in the Football League for Chesterfield, York City and Bournemouth, in non-League football for British Eckna Works, and was on the books of Preston North End without making a league appearance.

References

1929 births
Living people
Footballers from Liverpool
English footballers
Association football forwards
Preston North End F.C. players
Chesterfield F.C. players
York City F.C. players
AFC Bournemouth players
English Football League players